Galina Shoidagbaeva (Russian: Гали́на Бадмажа́повна Шойдагба́ева; born in 1953) is a Buryat Soviet and Russian opera soprano and teacher. She was awarded People's Artist of the USSR (1990).

Early life 
Galina Shojdagbaeva was born on July 5, 1953 in the village of Sosnovo-Ozerskoe (Yeravninsky District, Republic of Buryatia).

After graduating from high school, Shoydagbaeva entered Tchaikovsky Music School in the class of People's Artist of the RSFSR N. Petrova. In 1980 she graduated from the Leningrad Rimsky-Korsakov Conservatory in the class of T. Novichenko.

Career 
In 1980 she became soloist of the Buryat Opera and Ballet Theater. She performs solo concerts.

In 1988 she became a teacher at the Tchaikovsky Ulan-Ude Music College.

Shoydgbaeva is a professor at the East Siberian State Academy of Culture and Arts, where in 1993 the vocal department was opened. She chairs the solo singing department.

Operas 

"Aida" by G. Verdi - Aida
"Othello" by G. Verdi - Desdemona
"Troubadour" by G. Verdi - Leonora
"Cio-Cio-San" G. Puccini - Madame Butterfly
"Tosca" by G. Puccini - Tosca
Turandot by G. Puccini - Turandot
"Prince Igor" P. Borodin - Yaroslavna
"Iolanta" by P. Tchaikovsky - Iolanthe
"The Queen of Spades" by P. Tchaikovsky - Lisa
"Carmen" by G. Bizet - Mikaela
"Enkh-Bulat bator"  - Arjun-Goohon
"Geser" A. Andreev - Urmai-Gokhon khatan
"Gala concert" by the Buryatia State Academic Tsydynzhapov Opera and Ballet Theatre

External links 
 ШОЙДАГБАЕВА ГАЛИНА БАДМАЖАПОВНА
 Шойдагбаева Галина Бадмажаповна

See also 
Buryatia

References 

People from Buryatia
Buryat people
Honored Artists of the RSFSR
People's Artists of the USSR
Russian operatic sopranos
Soviet women opera singers
1953 births
Living people
20th-century Russian women opera singers